In the branch of Jewish mysticism known as Kabbalah, Daʻat or Da'ath (in pausa:) is the location (the mystical state) where all ten sefirot in the Tree of Life are united as one.

In Daʻat, all sefirot exist in their perfected state of infinite sharing. The three sefirot of the left column that would receive and conceal the Divine light, instead share and reveal it. Since all sefirot radiate infinitely self-giving Divine Light, it is no longer possible to distinguish one sefira from another; thus they are one.

Daʻat is not always depicted in representations of the sefirot; and could be abstractly considered an "empty slot" into which the germ of any other sefirot can be placed. Properly, the Divine Light is always shining, but not all humans can see it.

The revelation or the concealment of the Divine Light shining through Daʻat does not happen only in Daʻat itself. It can appear by a human perspective also within the worldly affairs (Malkuth). The perception of the Divine Light shining can clearly occur also in Malkuth, all the times that humans become self-giving (Altruism). However, humans who remain selfish (Selfishness) cannot see it, and for them its benefits seem "hidden".

As a representative sefirah
Properly, Daʻat is not a sefirah, but rather is all ten sefirot united as one. Nevertheless, Daʻat is sometimes counted as a sefirah instead of Keter, from the perspective of finite creation, using Daʻat to represent the "reflection of" (the "inner dimension" of) the infinity of Keter. Thus Daʻat appears in the configuration of the sefirot along the middle axis, directly beneath Keter. It corresponds to the image of God. Alternate countings of the sefirot produce 10 powers ("10 and not 9, 10 and not 11" - Sefer Yetzirah) by either including Keter or Daʻat. In the scheme of Moses ben Jacob Cordovero, Daʻat is omitted, while in the scheme of Isaac Luria, Keter (Will) is omitted. Cordovero describes the sefirot as one light in ten vessels. Luria follows this, but lists sefirot beginning with Chokhmah (Wisdom) to describe their outer dimensions.

As spiritual state
The kochos hanefesh "spiritual state" corresponding to the sefirah of Daʻat is yichud ("unification").

As aspect of intellect
According to the Tanya, Daʻat is the third and hidden more special unconscious power of intellect. But in this context, it is actually the divine aspect of Daʻat to the partzuf of Zeir Anpin (connection directly to the upper Daʻat of Adam Kadmon).

Zer Anpin refers to the 'personification' (partzuf) of six sefirot from Chesed to Yesod - and as a whole embodies its own ten sefirot and its own Daʻat. Zer Anpin personifies the revelation of the Torah and relates to the second level of the human soul called "spirit" (ruach), that corresponds to mental aspects, including reason and emotion.

Accordingly, Daʻat is associated in the soul with the powers of memory and concentration, powers that rely upon one's "recognition" (hakarah) of, and "sensitivity to" (hergesh), the potential meaningfulness of those ideas generated in consciousness through the powers of Chokhmah and Binah "understanding".

Levels

Daʻat operates on two levels. The higher level, referred to as Daʻat Elyon ("higher knowledge") or Daʻat hane'elam ("the hidden knowledge"), serves to secure the continuous bond between the two higher powers of intellect -- chokhmah and Binah, wisdom and understanding. This is Daʻat within Keter.

The lower level, referred to as Daʻat Tachton ("lower knowledge") or Daʻat hamitpashet ("extending knowledge"), serves to connect the intellect as a whole with the realm of emotion; thereby enhancing one's determination and resolve to act in accordance with the essential truths that one has integrated into consciousness. This is Daʻat as the third power of the intellect.

Lower level
Of this level of Daʻat it is said (Book of Proverbs 24:4): "And by knowledge shall the chambers be filled with all precious and pleasant riches." "The rooms" are the chambers of the heart, the emotions of the soul (as alluded to by the word cheder, "room," which is an acronym for chesed din rachamim, the three primary emotions of the soul). The inner consciousness of Daʻat fills these rooms and enlivens them as does the soul to the body.

In the Zohar, this level of Daʻat is referred to as "the key that includes six." The "key" of Daʻat opens all six chambers (attributes) of the heart and fills them with life-force. Each of these six chambers, when filled with Daʻat, is referred to as a particular dei'ah ("attitude," from the root of Daʻat) of the soul.

Daʻat corresponds with the interstitium in the human body. In the brain, Daʻat is represented by the claustrum. Though their form is seemingly separate and dissimilar, their function is fairly similar.

See also
Divine light
Da'as Elyon and Da'as Tachton

References

 Daʻat The Knowing I, by Rabbi Tzvi Freeman Daʻat - The Knowing I

External links
 Inner.org about Kabbalah
 Lessons in Tanya
Devekut.com A compendium of teachings related to da'at

Sephirot
Kabbalistic words and phrases